The 148th Massachusetts General Court, consisting of the Massachusetts Senate and the Massachusetts House of Representatives, met in 1933 and 1934.

Senators

Representatives

See also
 1934 Massachusetts gubernatorial election
 73rd United States Congress
 List of Massachusetts General Courts

References

External links
 
 
 
 

Political history of Massachusetts
Massachusetts legislative sessions
massachusetts
1933 in Massachusetts
massachusetts
1934 in Massachusetts